The Hobart Arena is a 3,782-seat multi-purpose arena in Troy, Ohio. It officially opened with 10 sold-out performances of Holiday on Ice in September 1950.   The Hobart Arena, contrary to popular belief, was not the first Ohio venue for Elvis Presley on November 24, 1956, as he had played in Cleveland a year earlier.  The 1950s also saw performances by Roy Rogers, Gene Autry, Nat King Cole, Tex Ritter, Sonja Henie, Victor Borge, Liberace, Guy Lombardo,  and Patti Page.

Hobart Arena was the home of the Troy Bruins of the IHL from 1951 through 1959 and the Troy (later Miami Valley) Sabres from 1982 until the AAHL folded in 1989.

As a concert venue the arena can seat up to 5,282. When used for ice hockey, Hobart Arena has a sellout capacity of 4,500. When used for trade shows the arena can accommodate  of space. The arena contains four permanent concession stands, four dressing rooms and a referee's room, seven box-office windows, and a ceiling height of only .

It was the home to the Miami Valley Silverbacks of the Continental Indoor Football League.

References

External links
Official webpage
Troy Bruins AAHL Official site

Indoor arenas in Ohio
Sports venues in Ohio
Buildings and structures in Miami County, Ohio
1950 establishments in Ohio
Sports venues completed in 1950
Indoor ice hockey venues in Ohio